Order of the Three Stars is the highest civilian order awarded for meritorious service to Latvia. It was established in 1924 in remembrance of the founding of Latvia. Its motto is "Per aspera ad astra", meaning "Through hardships to the stars". The Order has five ranks and three grades of medals of honour.

The ranks
 Commander Grand Cross with Chain (1st class with Chain) see below
 Commander Grand Cross (1st class)
 Grand Officer (2nd class)
 Commander (3rd class)
 Officer (4th class)
 Bearer (5th class)
 Medal of Honour, 1st Class
 Medal of Honour, 2nd Class
 Medal of Honour, 3rd Class

The cross
The cross of the order is white enamel cross within gilded edges. In the center of the front side of the cross there is blue enamel medallion with three golden five-point stars on it. The reverse side has gilded medallion with inscriptions "Per aspera ad astra" and "Latvijas Republika — 1918.g.18. novembris".

The Stars
The Stars are first and second rate orders. The first rate order and the second rate order, (the great star and the small  star, respectively) have similar design and differ only in size. The stars are in shape of five point star made of silver with blue enamel medallion with three golden five-point stars in its center. On its edge there is inscription "Par Tēviju".

Chain of the Order
Chain of the Order is awarded to Commander of the Grand Cross in exceptional cases. It has ten gilded links with alternately chiseled images of three stars, fire-cross, and fasces supported by lion and griffin.

Medal of honour 
Medal of honour is a round medal on front of which the cross of the order is depicted. The reverse side has inscription "Par Tēviju" with a flaming heart below the inscription. It has a wreath of oak leaves on its edge. The medal of honour has three grades – gold, silver and bronze.

See also
 List of notable recipients of the Order of the Three Stars

References

External links
The State Decorations of Latvia, Office of the President.
The Three-Star Order

Orders, decorations, and medals of Latvia
Three Stars, Order of the
Awards established in 1924
1924 establishments in Latvia
Order of the Three Stars